This is a partial list of the notable television series that are primarily focused on the art of tattoo, and have articles on Wikipedia.

TV shows
 Bad Ink (2013–2014)
 Best Ink (2012–2014)
 Black Ink Crew (2013–present)
 Black Ink Crew: Chicago (2015–present)
 Black Ink Crew: Compton (2019–present)
 Bondi Ink Tattoo Crew (2015–2017)
 Epic Ink (2014)
 How Far Is Tattoo Far? (2018–2019)
 Ink Master (2012–present)
 Ink Master: Angels (2017–2018)
 Just Tattoo of Us (2017–2020)
 LA Ink (2007–2011)
 London Ink (2007–2009)
 Miami Ink (2005–2008)
 NY Ink (2011–2013)
 Tattoo Fixers (2015–2019)
 Tattoo Nightmares (2012–2015)
 Tattoo Titans (2013–2014)

References

Further reading
 
 
 
 

Tattoo